The Calypso Lemonade 150 is an ARCA Menards Series/ARCA Menards Series East combination race held at Iowa Speedway in Newton, Iowa. The inaugural race was held on October 15, 2006 and was 250 laps in length. The race was shortened to 200 laps in 2009 and 150 laps in 2013. From 2015 to 2020, the race was held on the same weekend as the IndyCar Series race at Iowa. The ARCA Menards Series East, formerly the NASCAR K&N Pro Series East, joined the ARCA Menards Series in this race starting in 2021 and it became one of three combination races for the two series, the others being Milwaukee and Bristol.

Past winners

2012 and 2015: Race extended due to a green–white–checker finish.

Multiple winners (drivers)

Multiple winners (teams)

Manufacturer wins

References

External links
 

2006 establishments in Iowa
ARCA Menards Series races
ARCA Menards Series
ARCA Menards Series East
Motorsport in Iowa
Recurring sporting events established in 2006
NASCAR races at Iowa Speedway